Founded 1975, the International Agency for the Prevention of Blindness (IAPB) is an international alliance working to promote eye health. It has over 150 members, mainly NGOs and civil society, corporate organisations, professional bodies and research institutions who are working in the prevention of blindness. This agency is a partner of World Health Organization.

References

Health in the London Borough of Tower Hamlets
International medical and health organizations
International organisations based in London
Medical associations
Optometry